"Pump the Brakes" is a song by Australian record producer Dom Dolla. It was released on 26 March 2021, via Sweat It Out. Dolla wrote and produced the song.

At the 2021 ARIA Music Awards, the song was nominated for Best Dance Release.

Background
In an press release, Dolla shared: "I produced this record specifically to play at the Shrine in LA in early 2020. It was written as a tongue in cheek story partly inspired by my first car, an old Camry that collects dust in Melbourne while I'm away on tour. I wasn't sure what to do with the record when dance floors paused around the world. But I've received requests for it every other day since. All things considered, I figured it's probably time to get it out there into the world."

Critical reception
Katie Stone of EDM.com felt that the song was "a clear progression from his breakout single 'Take It' which came out back in 2018." Hayden Davies of Pilerats commented that it "[is] rushing with energy, emphasising a pulsing four-on-the-floor kick and moulding it together with strobing melodies and sampling that gives the track the same infectious edge that people have come to adore through his recent work."

Music video
An accompanying "car-culture vibe" music video was released on 14 May 2021, and directed by Prad Sen. The video is set "in a run-down over stocked car yard", and focuses on Dolla's vehicle, a 2001 Toyota Camry. It also features "characters' eccentric styling, including spoiler-styled haircuts, obnoxious jewelry, and matching tracksuits, with Dom himself joining them for the ludicrous ride."

Charts

References

2021 singles
2021 songs
Dom Dolla songs
Song recordings produced by Dom Dolla
Songs written by Dom Dolla
RCA Records singles